Achena Atithi is a 1973 Bengali film directed by Sukhen Das and Gyanesh Mukherjee. This film released under the banner Sara Productions. The film starring Rabi Ghosh, Samit Bhanja, Sukhen Das in lead roles. The film's music was composed by Ajoy Das.

Cast
 Rabi Ghosh
 Samit Bhanja
 Sukhen Das
 Ratna Ghoshal
 Gyanesh Mukherjee
 Swarup Dutta
 Jogesh Sadhu
 Joyshree Ray

References

External links
 
 Achena Atithi (1973) in Gomolo

1973 films
Bengali-language Indian films
1970s Bengali-language films
Films directed by Sukhen Das
Films scored by Ajoy Das